Cristóbal López Romero  (born 19 May 1952) is a Spanish-born prelate of the Catholic Church who has served as the Archbishop of Rabat since March 2018. He is a member of the Salesians and before becoming a bishop devoted himself to pastoral work in Latin America while taking on administrative responsibilities within his order.

Pope Francis raised him to the rank of cardinal on 5 October 2019.

Biography
Cristóbal López Romero was born on 19 May 1952 in Vélez-Rubio, Spain.  He joined the Salesians in 1964 and studied at the Salesian Seminaries of Gerona and Barcelona, studying philosophy from  1973 to 1975 and theology from 1975 to 1979. He earned a licenciate in Information Sciences, Journalism section, at the Autonomous University of Barcelona in 1982. He took his first vows as a Salesian on 16 August 1968 and made his solemn profession on 2 August 1974. He was ordained a priest on 19 May 1979.

His career has combined pastoral ministries with administrative positions within his order, mostly in Paraguay. From 1979 to 1984 he was minister for the marginalized in the La Verneda area of Barcelona; from 1984 to 1986 Youth Minister at the Salesian College of Asunción, Paraguay; from 1986 to 1992 Provincial Delegate for vocational youth ministry in Asunción; from 1992 to 1994 a parish priest in Asunción; from 2000 to 2002 head of the Salesian community and teacher in the College of Asunción; from 2002 to 2003 a minister in the missions in Paraguay.

He moved to Morocco in 2003, where he was Director of the Salesian community, of parish and scholastic pastoral care in the vocational training center in Kénitra.

Within his order, he was Director of the Salesian Bulletin in Asunción from 1991 to 1992. He was Provincial of the Salesian Province of Paraguay from 1994 to 2000; he headed the Salesian Province of Bolivia from 2011 to 2014; since then he has led the Salesian Province of María Auxiliadora in Spain.

On 29 December 2017, Pope Francis named him Archbishop of Rabat. He received his episcopal consecration on 10 March 2018 from Cardinal Juan José Omella, Archbishop of Barcelona. Anticipating the visit of Pope Francis to Morocco in the spring of 2019, he described the Church in Morocco as "vibrant" and "young": "More young than old people come to our churches, more men than women, more black than white people." He emphasized its international character, caring for migrants from countries south of the Sahara with Church personnel drawn from more than forty countries.

On 24 May 2019, Pope Francis named him Apostolic Administrator of the Archdiocese of Tangier.

On 5 October 2019, Pope Francis made him Cardinal Priest of San Leone I. He was made a member of the Pontifical Council for Interreligious Dialogue on 21 February 2020.

See also
Cardinals created by Francis
Catholic Church in Morocco

References

External links

Living people
1952 births
People from Almería
Salesian bishops
Salesian cardinals
21st-century Roman Catholic archbishops in Morocco
Cardinals created by Pope Francis
21st-century Spanish cardinals
Moroccan cardinals
Roman Catholic archbishops of Rabat
Moroccan Roman Catholic archbishops